The following is an alphabetical list of members of the United States House of Representatives from the state of North Carolina.  For chronological tables of members of both houses of the United States Congress from the state (through the present day), see United States congressional delegations from North Carolina. The list of names should be complete, but other data may be incomplete.

Current representatives 
As of January 3, 2023

 : Donald G. Davis (D) (since 2023)
 : Deborah K. Ross (D) (since 2021)
 : Greg Murphy (R) (since 2019)
 : Valerie Foushee (D) (since 2023)
 : Virginia Foxx (R) (since 2005)
 : Kathy Manning (D) (since 2021)
 : David Rouzer (R) (since 2015)
 : Dan Bishop (R) (since 2019)
 : Richard Hudson (R) (since 2013)
 : Patrick McHenry (R) (since 2005)
 : Chuck Edwards (R) (since 2023)
 : Alma Adams (D) (since 2014)
 : Wiley Nickel (D) (since 2023)
 : Jeff Jackson (D) (since 2023)

List of members of the U.S. House of Representatives

See also

List of United States senators from North Carolina
United States congressional delegations from North Carolina
North Carolina's congressional districts

North Carolina
United States representatives

United States representatives